The 2021 FEI World Cup Finals for both dressage and show jumping were scheduled to be held between March 30 and April 4, 2021 in Gothenburg, Sweden. The event was to be held in the Scandinavium Arena and should have represented the conclusion of the 2020-21 Dressage and Show jumping World Cup Seasons.

The Finals got cancelled on March 12, due to the EHV-1 outbreak in Europe.

Background 
Due to the COVID-19 pandemic, the 2020 FEI World Cup Finals in Las Vegas got cancelled on short notice. It was the first time that the FEI World Cup Finals got cancelled since their inclusion in 1978 for show jumping, and 1985 for dressage.

The pandemic affected the 2020-21 World Cup Seasons in both dressage and jumping. Numerous qualifiers, including the complete Western European and North American jumping circuits, got scratched. This forced the FEI to introduce new qualifying procedures for the Finals in Gothenburg.

In February 2021, an outbreak of an aggressive strain of the neurological form of Equine Herpes Virus (EHV-1) was reported in Valencia, Spain. This caused the International Equestrian Federation to cancel all competition on the European mainland through March 28. The outbreak put the 2021 FEI World Cup Finals under uncertainty, and the competition eventually got cancelled once the cancellation period got extended to April 11.

Dressage

Qualification 
The list of qualified athletes was released on March 11, 2021.

Show jumping

Qualification 
For the show jumping, due to a number of cancelled qualifiers, most qualification spots for the Finals have been distributed to national federations (NFs) rather than specific athletes. National federations are tasked with the athlete selection.

References

External links 
 Gothenburg Horse Show (English / Swedish)

2021 in equestrian
Dressage World Cup
Show Jumping World Cup
2021 in Swedish sport
International sports competitions in Gothenburg
FEI World Cup Finals
2020s in Gothenburg
Equestrian sports competitions in Sweden
International sports competitions hosted by Sweden
Cancelled sports events